Sidney Santos de Brito (born 16 October 1979 in Recife), known as Sidney, is a Brazilian former professional footballer who played as a defender. He spent one season in the Bundesliga with FC Energie Cottbus.

References

Living people
1979 births
Association football defenders
Brazilian footballers
Ceará Sporting Club players
VfL Osnabrück players
Rot-Weiss Essen players
FC Energie Cottbus players
Kickers Offenbach players
Sportfreunde Lotte players
Bundesliga players
2. Bundesliga players
Regionalliga players
Brazilian expatriate footballers
Brazilian expatriate sportspeople in Germany
Expatriate footballers in Germany
Sportspeople from Recife